Pou is a Catalan surname; a topographic name for someone who lived by a well, pou ‘well’ (Latin puteus ‘well’, ‘pit’).

Notable people with the name include:
 The New Orleans physician at the center of the Anna Pou case
 Bartolomé Pou (1727–1802), Spanish writer
 Edward W. Pou (1863–1934), American politician
 Genevieve Pou (1919–2007), American novelist
 Josep Maria Pou (born 1944), Spanish actor
 Julia Pou (born 1947), Uruguayan politician
 Luis Lacalle Pou (born 1973), Uruguayan politician
 Miguel Pou (1880–1968), Puerto Rican painter, draftsman and art professor
 Nellie Pou (born 1956), American politician
 Saveros Pou (1929–2020), French linguist
 Pou Sohtireak, 20th and 21st century Cambodian politician
 Terrance John Pou (born 1962), birth name of Mika X, New Zealand Māori singer, performance artist, actor, filmmaker, TV producer and comedian
 Pou Vannary, Cambodian singer

See also
 Pou (disambiguation)
 Pou-Pou

Catalan-language surnames